The Rosemont Historic District is a historic district in Alexandria, in the U.S. state of Virginia.  It was added to the National Register of Historic Places in 1992.

Rosemont is a lushly planted residential area occupying some 84 acres in northwest Alexandria, located adjacent to Alexandria Union Station (ALX). It was developed between 1908 and 1914 by a group of Washington, Alexandria, and Philadelphia investors. The houses were built near the trolley line, allowing residents to work in Washington and live in a suburban neighborhood. Rosemont’s more than 450 residences are a prime example of the era’s middle-class architecture. House styles range from the American Craftsman, American Foursquare and Arts and Crafts movement to the sedate composition of Colonial Revival homes. The intact original street plan reflects suburban planning ideals of the early 1900s City Beautiful movement.

There are 456 contributing buildings, including 336 houses and apartment buildings, one school, one commercial building, and 118 private garages. One contributing structure and one contributing object were previously listed in the National Register as part of the Boundary Markers of the Original District of Columbia Multiple Property Submission: Southwest # 2 Boundary Marker. The historic district is bounded on the southeast by the Richmond, Fredericksburg and Potomac Railroad line.

References

Geography of Alexandria, Virginia
Houses in Alexandria, Virginia
History of Alexandria, Virginia
Historic districts in Northern Virginia
Historic districts on the National Register of Historic Places in Virginia
Houses on the National Register of Historic Places in Virginia
National Register of Historic Places in Alexandria, Virginia
Colonial Revival architecture in Virginia